Live at the Half-Note is an album by Art Farmer's Quartet featuring guitarist Jim Hall recorded in 1963 at the Half Note Club and released on the Atlantic label.

Reception

The Allmusic review by Scott Yanow states, "Hall was a perfect musical partner for Farmer since both musicians have mellow sounds and thoughtful improvising styles that are more complex than expected".

Track listing
 "Stompin' at the Savoy" (Benny Goodman, Andy Razaf, Edgar Sampson, Chick Webb) - 12:27     
 "Swing Spring" (Miles Davis) - 5:51     
 "What's New?" (Johnny Burke, Bob Haggart) - 4:24     
 "I Want to Be Happy" (Irving Caesar, Vincent Youmans) - 9:41     
 "I'm Gettin' Sentimental Over You" (George Bassman, Ned Washington) - 5:03

Personnel
Art Farmer - flugelhorn
Jim Hall - guitar
Steve Swallow - bass
Walter Perkins - drums

References 

1964 live albums
Art Farmer live albums
Jim Hall (musician) live albums
Albums produced by Arif Mardin
Atlantic Records live albums